The 2015 Glastonbury Festival of Contemporary Performing Arts was held from 24 to 28 June 2015.

On 17 June 2015, it was announced that the Foo Fighters had cancelled a number of appearances, including the Friday night headline slot at Glastonbury 2015, due to lead singer Dave Grohl falling off stage and fracturing his leg during the band's concert in Gothenburg, Sweden. Florence and the Machine were announced as their replacement on 17 June. As part of their set, Florence and the Machine performed a cover of the Foo Fighters', "Times Like These", which they dedicated to Grohl.

The biggest crowd of the weekend was drawn by Lionel Richie, who drew 100,000-120,000 people for the "Legend" slot on Sunday afternoon.

Tickets
General Admission Tickets for the festival cost £225.

Weather
The weather was mostly sunny, but it rained quite a lot on Friday afternoon and Sunday morning.

Line-up

Stages 1-5
Source: Line up poster

References

External links

2015 in British music
2015 in England
2010s in Somerset
2015
June 2015 events in the United Kingdom